Surat International Airport , also known as Surat Gujarat Airport, is an international airport serving Surat and Southern Gujarat. It is located in Magdalla, situated 12 km (6.4 mi) from the city centre. It has a total area of 770 acres (312 ha), and is the second busiest airport in Gujarat after Ahmedabad, in terms of both aircraft movements and passenger traffic. It was awarded the status of a customs airport on 9 June 2018. It is also home to a flying training school.

History
Surat Airport was built by the state government of Gujarat in early 1970s. The first airline to operate was Safari Airways (owned by Vijaypat Singhania of Raymonds group) with flights to Bombay and Bhavnagar with small aircraft, most probably a Douglas DC-3 Dakota in the early 1970s, which was eventually discontinued in a year or two. During the 1990s, Vayudoot and Gujarat Airways flew to Surat Airport, but discontinued their flights in May 1994 and January 2000, respectively. The airport, with a  airstrip and an adjoining  apron was then transferred to the Airports Authority of India (AAI) in 2003, who began to modernise the airport. After a failed initial attempt in July 2004 to connect Surat with Mumbai and Bhavnagar due to poor airport infrastructure, the now defunct airline Air Deccan operated an ATR 42 aircraft daily from November 2004 to July 2005.

In 2007, the airport's 1,400-metre long runway was extended to 2,250 metres, to enable landing of larger aircraft. Subsequently, commercial services resumed on 6 May 2007 with an Indian Airlines Airbus A319 flight to Delhi flagged off by Indian Civil Aviation Minister Praful Patel at 12:40 IST. However, in October 2007, the runway was reportedly damaged due to poor quality of work during its extension. As a result, a limitation was imposed on the runway to not allow more than two operations of aircraft having weight of over 75,000 kilograms up to its rated capacity of 80,000 kg until the runway was repaired.
In 2009, the AAI announced that the airport required 864 hectares of land, and the Gujarat government had allocated such land for the development. Planned improvements at the airport included a capacity to handle up to seven jets at a time and extending the runway to 3,810 meters. The extension work of the runway was to have begun in 2009.
The November 2014 collision of a buffalo with a SpiceJet Boeing 737 prompted the AAI to address the safety issues at the airport and extend the runway from 2,250 metres to 2,905 metres at a cost of 500 million. The runway extension and repair was taken up in three phases. In the first phase, the runway was extended by 655 metres.

The adjoining concrete apron measures 235 by 90 metres, and is linked by two taxiways to its sole runway that is oriented 04/22, was 2,250 metres long and 45 metres wide, but was extended to 2,905 metres in 2017. The airfield is equipped with night landing facilities and an instrument landing system (ILS) as well as navigational facilities like DVOR/DME and an NDB.

Terminal

Integrated terminal 
The new Surat Airport terminal building was inaugurated on 27 February 2009 by Union Minister of State for Petroleum Dinsha Patel. It is equipped with CCTV cameras, two baggage carousels in the arrivals hall, and one hand baggage X-ray machine, among other modern facilities like two air bridges with Visual Docking Guidance System, two elevators and two escalators, and a 120-seat lounge. Coffee Culture and other shops have been added.

Future expansion 

The construction work for the expansion of the terminal building at Surat Airport started in March 2020. The budget for the project is 3.53 billion, and the project is expected to completed by March 2023. The extended terminal building will have a total area of 25,520 sq. m. After the extension, the terminal building will be capable of handling 1,800 passengers (1,200 domestic and 600 international) during peak hours daily. The extended terminal building will be equipped with 20 check-in counters, 26 immigration counters, 5 aerobridges, baggage conveyors, and parking spaces to accommodate more than 500 cars. The other planned infrastructure development at Surat Airport includes an extension of the apron for an additional 10 bays for code c aircraft and a full-length parallel taxiway. The expansion will turn Surat Airport into an international airport.

Cargo terminal 
The cargo terminal of Surat Airport was inaugurated on 29 January 2020. AAI approved a plan for the modular cargo terminal at Surat Airport. After the approval of the tender, work on constructing of new cargo terminal was awarded to a Surat-based company for the 14,000 sq.ft. cargo complex with a ground-level area of 10,800 sq.ft. and first-floor area of 3,200 sq.ft. respectively. Construction of the cargo terminal was completed within the project completion period of 13 months. AAI has future plans to build a cargo terminal at Surat Airport and has reserved land for the same.

Airlines and destinations

Statistics

See also
 List of airports in India
 List of the busiest airports in India

References

Airports in Gujarat
Transport in Surat
Buildings and structures in Surat
Airports established in the 1970s
1970s establishments in Gujarat
International airports in India
20th-century architecture in India